Arthur Lee Malone (March 20, 1948 – July 27, 2012) was a former professional American football running back in the National Football League for seven seasons for the Atlanta Falcons and Philadelphia Eagles.  He played college football at Arizona State University and was drafted in the second round of the 1970 NFL Draft. 

He is the older brother of Benny Malone.

References

1948 births
2012 deaths
American football running backs
Arizona State Sun Devils football players
Atlanta Falcons players
Philadelphia Eagles players
Sportspeople from Tyler, Texas
Sportspeople from Tempe, Arizona
Players of American football from Texas